Bijar Boneh-ye Bala (also Romanized as Bījār Boneh-ye Bālā; also known as Bījār Boneh) is a village in Layalestan Rural District, in the Central District of Lahijan County, Gilan Province, Iran. At the 2006 census, its population was 1,230, in 360 families.

References 

Populated places in Lahijan County